Qais Hadi Sayed Hasan al-Khazali (born 20 June 1974) is best known as the founder and leader of the Iran-backed Special Groups in Iraq from June 2006 until his capture by British forces in March 2007. As head of the Special Groups, Khazali directed arms shipment, formation of squads to participate in fighting, and insurgent operations, most notably the 20 January 2007 attack on American forces in Karbala. A former follower of Muqtada al-Sadr, he was expelled from the Mahdi Army in 2004 for giving "unauthorized orders" and founded his own group: Asa'ib Ahl al-Haq (AAH) also known as the "Khazali network" that was later designated as a terrorist group by the U.S. Department of State. During his incarceration, Akram al-Kaabi became acting commander of the organization until his release.

Arrest and release
On the night of 20 March 2007 G squadron of the British SAS raided a house in Basra containing Khazali and arrested him along with his brother and his Lebanese advisor without casualties and gained valuable intelligence.

Khazali was released in January 2010, in exchange for Peter Moore, who had been kidnapped by Asa'ib Ahl al-Haq. In December that year, notorious special groups commanders Abu Deraa and Mustafa al-Sheibani were allowed to return to Iraq and declared they would be working with Khazali after their return. Since his release, al-Khazali pivoted from attacking U.S.-led Coalition forces in Iraq to recruiting for pro-Assad Shi'ite militias in Syria.

Sanctions
On 6 December 2019, the U.S. Treasury Department sanctioned Khazali for "involvement in serious human rights abuse in Iraq," and addressed his role in the violent repression of Iraqi protests beginning in October 2019. During the protests, AAH militia forces controlled by Khazali, opened fire on and killed peaceful protesters.

On 31 December 2019, U.S. Secretary of State Mike Pompeo named Khazali, along with Abu Mahdi al-Muhandis, Hadi al-Amiri, and Falih Alfayyadh, as responsible for the attack on the United States embassy in Baghdad.

On 3 January 2020, U.S. Department of State designated Asa'ib Ahl al-Haq as a foreign terrorist organization (FTO), with Qais al-Khazali and his brother Laith al-Khazali as Specially Designated Global Terrorists (SDGT) under Executive Order 13224.

Notes

Sources

External links

Asa'ib Ahl al-Haq
Iraqi insurgency (2003–2011)
Iraqi Shia clerics
Iraqi Shia Muslims
Terrorism in Iraq
Living people
1974 births
Anti-Americanism
Iraqi people of Iranian descent
Anti-Zionism in Iraq
Twelvers
Iraqi prisoners and detainees
People of the War in Iraq (2013–2017)
Members of the Popular Mobilization Forces
People of the Iraqi insurgency (2003–2011)
Individuals designated as terrorists by the United States government
People sanctioned under the Magnitsky Act